The white-backed woodswallow (Artamus insignis) or Bismarck woodswallow, is a species of bird in the family Artamidae.
It is endemic as its name suggests, to the Bismarck Archipelago (Papua New Guinea).

Its natural habitat is subtropical or tropical moist lowland forests.

References

Artamus
Birds of the Bismarck Archipelago
Birds described in 1877
Taxonomy articles created by Polbot
Taxa named by Philip Sclater